Benjamin Glazer (May 7, 1887 – March 18, 1956) was a screenwriter, producer, foley artist, and director of American films from the 1920s through the 1950s. He made the first translation of Ferenc Molnár's play Liliom into English in 1921. His translation was used in the original Broadway production, in the 1930 film version, and in every production in English of the play until recently. It also served as the basis for the libretto for Rodgers and Hammerstein's Carousel,  as well as for Phoebe and Henry Ephron's screenplay for the 1956 film version of the classic musical.

Glazer was born in Belfast, Ireland, into a Hungarian Jewish family. After moving to the United States, he studied at the University of Pennsylvania Law School and passed the bar exam to become a lawyer in 1906.

Glazer was one of the founding members of the Academy of Motion Picture Arts and Sciences. He is best known for his Oscar-winning writing for 7th Heaven (1927) and Arise, My Love (1941). Additional screenwriting credits include The Merry Widow, Flesh and the Devil, Mata Hari, A Farewell to Arms, We're Not Dressing, and Tortilla Flat.

Glazer also directed one film, the 1948 Song of My Heart, a highly fictionalized biography of Tchaikovsky.

Glazer was married to actress Sharon Lynn. He died of circulatory failure in Hollywood, at the age of 68.

Selected filmography

(as screenwriter unless otherwise noted)
 Sinners in Silk (1924)
 The Great Divide (1924)
 Fine Clothes (1925)
 The Merry Widow (1925)
 Memory Lane (1926)
 The Gay Deceiver (1926)
 Wild Oats Lane (1926)
 Flesh and the Devil (1926)
 The Lady in Ermine (1927)
 7th Heaven (1927)
 Paid to Love (1927)
 The Trail of '98 (1928)
 Beggars of Life (1928)
 The Boudoir Diplomat (1930)
 The Devil to Pay! (1930)
 Liliom (1930)
 Pagan Lady (1931)
 Mata Hari (1931)
 Monsieur Albert (1932)
 A Farewell to Arms (1932)
 No Man Of Her Own (1932)
 The Way to Love (1933)
 We're Not Dressing (1934)
 She Loves Me Not (1934) (also producer)
 Rhythm on the Range (1934) (also producer)
 Four Daughters (1938) (assoc. producer)
 Going Places (1938) (assoc. producer)
 Yes, My Darling Daughter (1939) (assoc. producer)
 They Made Me a Criminal (1939) (assoc. producer)
 Arise, My Love (1940) (story)
 Paris Calling (1941)
 Tortilla Flat (1942)
 Song of My Heart (1948) (also director)
 Carousel (1955) (libretto)

References

External links

 
 

Academy of Motion Picture Arts and Sciences founders
Best Story Academy Award winners
Best Adapted Screenplay Academy Award winners
Irish Jews
1887 births
1956 deaths
University of Pennsylvania Law School alumni
Screenwriters from Northern Ireland
Male writers from Northern Ireland
Television writers from Northern Ireland
Television directors from Northern Ireland